Canoe Lake is a lake in geographic Syine Township in the Unorganized Part of Thunder Bay District, Ontario, Canada, about  northeast of the municipality of Terrace Bay.

The lake has a number of unnamed tributaries, and has as its outflow an unnamed west branching of Fishnet Creek that leads to Jackfish Lake, and thence by a short channel into Lake Superior. Ontario Highway 17 travels along the north shore of the lake.

References

Lakes of Thunder Bay District